was laid down on 3 July 1944 at Camden, New Jersey, by the Mathis Yacht Building Company; launched on 12 February 1945; and placed in service on 4 May 1945.

The large harbor tug was assigned to the 8th Naval District and spent the next 15 years operating at New Orleans, LA. Her name was struck from the Navy list in April 1960, and she was transferred to the state of Louisiana in August of that year. She was operated by the Board of Commissioners of the Port of New Orleans as a firefighting tug until 1965. The tug was sold at public auction by the Louisiana government to Mr. George W. Whiteman on 9 August 1965

References
 

1945 ships
Tugs of the United States Navy
Ships built by the Mathis Yacht Building Company